Mashroom Ltd is an online lettings service and parent company of Tepilo.com and Emoov.co.uk. Founded in 2018, it purchased Emoov & Tepilo to compliment its online lettings platform in 2019.

Group History

Mashroom was founded by Stepan Dobrovolskiy in February 2018. In March 2018, Tepilo was sold to Emoov and became a subsidiary of Emoov. Emoov subsequently went into administration in December 2018. The Emoov brand and platform including Tepilo was acquired by Mashroom Ltd. in December 2018. Emoov relaunched under new management and new ownership in January 2019, where it sits alongside the Mashroom Lettings offering.

Tepilo 

Tepilo was  a UK-based online estate agent founded in 2009 by Sarah Beeny, a TV presenter on Channel 4 and digital product design studio, Codegent.  Initially a free For Sale By Owner (FSBO) service, Tepilo re-launched in October 2013 as an online-only estate agent. 

In November 2016, Tepilo opened new headquarters in central London. As of December 2017, Northern and Shell took over running and the directorships of the company.  

Today the company is dormant, with Emmoov being the sales platform that has been taken forward by Mashroom.

Emoov

EMoov is one of the leading online agencies in the U.K., having served over 20,000 customers since its original founding in 2010 by Russell Quirk. EMoov’s technology platform started development in 2013 and at the time of the acquisition by Mashroom, was on its third iteration. 

The company continues today as part of Mashroom.

References

External links
Mashroom - Lettings Service
Emoov- Sales Services
Former Tepilo Website - Redirects to Mashroom

Property companies based in London
Real estate companies established in 2009
British real estate websites
Property services companies of the United Kingdom
2009 establishments in the United Kingdom